Anna Frangiosa ("Annie A-Bomb") is a Philadelphia-based theater artist, costume designer, burlesque performer, director, instructor and model.

Education and early life
Frangiosa went to Lower Merion High School and graduated in 1993. She then studied design at the Fashion Institute of Technology and anthropology at Temple University.

Costume design work
Frangiosa has designed and built costumes primarily for new plays. Including for InterAct Theatre Company, B.Someday Productions, Brat Productions, Pig Iron Theatre Company, Lantern Theater Company, and many other theater and dance companies.

Performance history
Frangiosa began her burlesque career with the Peek-A-Boo Revue and performed with them from 1998 to 2005.
She founded the troupe Revival Burlesque in 2007. Revival is known for its sketch comedy mixed with sexy strip tease. Revival has been called  "Saturday Night Live with boobs" in the Philadelphia City Paper.

Frangiosa was the co-director, with Peter Gaffney, of the agit-prop and politically charged Cabaret Red Light, a vaudeville, burlesque and puppet theater company. She was a writer, performer, puppeteer, director and designer for Cabaret Red Light from 2008 to 2011.

The Cabaret Administration
In 2013 she founded The Cabaret Administration with their first production titled "F.T.L.F. or Free Think Love Frankenstein" a dance theater piece about Percy and Mary Shelley.

In 2014 the Cabaret Administration produced an original three part series of shows titled "Fin" and staged both a The Wonderful Wizard of Oz adaptation titled "Of Oz" and a The Nutcracker and the Mouse King adaptation titled "Nutcracker."

In 2015 The Cabaret Administration re-staged the "Fin" series as one longer production, also titled "Fin," and produced "Metropolis, a re-imagining of the 1927 Fritz Lang film of the same name. Both productions were staged at the Plays and Players Theatre in Philadelphia.

In 2017 The Cabaret Administration produced a two part re-imagining of The Last Unicorn, staging "Unicorn: The White Mare" and "Unicorn: The Red Bull" one month apart in March and April respectively. These halves were combined as one production in 2018.

Modeling
Frangiosa is also a pin-up model. She has been painted by illustrators Boris Vallejo, Julie Bell, and was pictured in their 2008, 2009, and 2010 fantasy art wall calendars. She appeared in Heavy Metal Magazine via illustrations by David Palumbo. Anna was a model for Dr Sketchy's Anti-Art School Philadelphia chapter in 2008, and 2009.

Other information and projects
Frangiosa founded the Philadelphia School of Burlesque in 2009.

She is known for her political involvement and often participates in demonstrations and direct actions including with Axis of Eve in 2004, and Occupy Philadelphia in 2011. In 2013 she marched from Philadelphia to Harrisburg with Decarcerate PA, a group focused on bringing attention to
prison expansion in Pennsylvania.

References

Philadelphia Inquirer
Locals join Occupy Philly movement South Philly Review
Philadelphia Weekly
NBC Philadelphia
Weekly Press
The Daily Pennsylvanian
Article about the Philadelphia School of Burlesque (City Paper)
Article on Revival Burlesque (City Paper)
Article on Anna Frangiosa in Philadelphia City Paper (City Paper)
CBS News on Annie A-Bomb's Burlesque class with Cabaret Red Light footage

External links
official website
The Cabaret Administration on Vimeo

American neo-burlesque performers
Artists from Philadelphia
Living people
Fashion Institute of Technology alumni
Lower Merion High School alumni
Year of birth missing (living people)